Lawrie Hodgson (19 January 1917 – 18 February 1980) was an English footballer, who played as a full back in the Football League for Tranmere Rovers.

References

External links

Tranmere Rovers F.C. players
Association football fullbacks
English Football League players
1917 births
1980 deaths
English footballers